The National Eye Institute (NEI) was established in 1968. It is located in Bethesda, Maryland, United States. The NEI is one of 27 institutes and centers of the US National Institutes of Health (NIH), an agency of the US Department of Health and Human Services. The mission of NEI is to prolong and protect the vision of the American people. The NEI conducts and performs research into treating and preventing diseases affecting the eye or vision.

History

Before the NEI was established, primary responsibility for vision research at NIH was done by the National Institute of Neurological Disease and Blindness (NINDB) (which is now known as the National Institute of Neurological Disorders and Stroke). NINDB was established in 1950, after President Harry S. Truman signed the Omnibus Medical Research Act.  The bill agreed to establish new separate institutes within NIH. This marked the beginning of vision research at a federal level.

Organizing, structuring, and separating vision and neurological research was a challenge at NINDB. NIH did its best to provide an equal budget plan for separate funding for vision research within NINDB. But there was not enough support and staff to handle more projects then what they were already undertaking. This led to the vision research program losing sufficient funding compared to the neurological research program. Some prominent members within the vision research community were not satisfied with how NINDB was operating. They did not approve of combining the two subjects of vision and neurological research together. This prompted some leading academic ophthalmologists and vision community supporters which included Bernard Becker, David Cogan, Edward Maumenee, Michael Hogan, John McLean, Frank Newell, Jules Stein, and Frank Winter to campaign for a separate institute that solely focused on vision research.

The group of supporters had rallied together to begin an effort to promote and advocate for a separate vision institute at NIH. They overcame obstacles and their efforts were finally rewarded. U.S. President Lyndon B. Johnson signed legislation creating the National Eye Institute, to be a part of the National Institutes of Health. The National Eye Institute (NEI) was established on August 16, 1968. This meant that the NEI would be the country's first civilian governmental body that focused on visual diseases and disorders in vision research.

The first director of NEI, Dr Carl Kupfer, was appointed on January 11, 1970. Kupfer wanted to establish and mold NEI into the lead agency in vision research. He wanted to make sure that the vision research program expanded and was focused on the entire visual system and not just part of it. During the first 14 years, the institute succeeded in attracting some noted researchers and doctors and increasing the number of researchers in vision science on its intramural staff. In 1983 NEI received national recognition for its leadership in both clinical ophthalmology and research on eye diseases and disorders.

Organizational structure

 Office of the Director:
 Director: Dr. Michael F. Chiang
 Deputy Director: Dr. Santa Tumminia
 Associate Director for Management: Brian Trent
 Scientific Director: Dr. Sheldon S Miller
 Director of Epidemiology and Clinical Applications: Dr. Emily Chew
 Director Division of Extramural Science Programs: Dr. Michael A. Steinmetz
Director Division of Extramural Activities: Kathleen Anderson
 Clinical Director: Dr. Brian Brooks
 Director of Science Communications, Public Liaison, and Education: Maria Zacharias
 Chief Information Officer:

Past Directors
Directors dating to 1970 - present

Research priorities

The NEI strives to be inclusive by requesting input from the community of vision researchers as well as professional and patient advocacy organizations. NEI planning activities are conducted under the auspices of the National Advisory Eye Council (NAEC), a committee of clinicians, researchers, patients and stakeholders that advises the institute on funding decisions, initiatives, and strategic planning.

The NEI recognizes that new ideas and concepts are constantly emerging and that the main engine for scientific discovery is investigator-initiated research. The most important priority is to support the highest quality research that will help achieve the mission of the NEI.

Some of the areas of interest include, retinal diseases, corneal diseases, lens and cataract, glaucoma and optic neuropathies, strabismus, amblyopia, and visual processing, and low vision and blindness rehabilitation.

In 2013, the NEI launched the Audacious Goals Initiative in Regenerative Medicine for Vision (AGI), originally the NEI Audacious Goals Initiative, to catalyze fundamental research toward "restoring vision through the regeneration of neurons and neural connections in the eye and visual system." The initiative targets photoreceptors and retinal ganglion cells. Currently, the AGI funds three research consortia, representing 16 projects and $62 million. The AGI Functional Imaging Consortium addresses the technical needs and opportunities for imaging cells of the visual system as they respond to light. The AGI Regenerative Factor Discovery Consortium is identifying factors that control cell regeneration in the visual system. The Translational-Enabling Models Consortium is developing animal models that have fidelity to human eye disease, a critical step toward testing regenerative therapies in clinical trials. Beyond direct funding, AGI has generated interest from the vision research community, helping to expand the NEI regenerative medicine portfolio.

Research achievements

NEI supported research has contributed to knowledge of how the eye functions in health and disease. Some of the research supported by the NEI includes:

Age-related macular degeneration

The Age-Related Eye Disease Study 

The Age-Related Eye Disease Study (AREDS) was a randomized clinical trial study that followed participants over eight years since the start of enrollment in 1992 and was completed in 2001. The study showed the combination of high levels of antioxidants and zinc can reduce the risk of advanced Age-Related Macular Degeneration (AMD) and its associated vision loss. This combination isn't a cure or treatment for AMD. The specific daily amounts of antioxidants and zinc used in the study were: 500 milligrams of vitamin C, 400 International Units of vitamin E, 15 milligrams of beta-carotene (equivalent to 25,000 International Units of vitamin A), 80 milligrams of zinc as zinc oxide, and 2 milligrams of copper as cupric oxide.

The Age-Related Eye Disease Study 2 (AREDS2) 
The Age-Related Eye Disease Study 2 (AREDS2) started in 2006 and was completed in 2012. AREDS2 is a second separate study from the original AREDS study. The purpose of this study was to improve and test different combinations of the original AREDS formula by adding omega-3 fatty acids, antioxidants lutein and zeaxanthin, removing beta-carotene, and lowering the amount of zinc. The antioxidants, lutein and zeaxanthin, were added to substitute beta-carotene from the formula because of the risk of lung cancer for smokers and former smokers found in a study conducted by the National Cancer Institute (NCI). Researchers added omega-3 fatty acids because of recent research found that it may be helpful to vision health and the zinc was lowered because some experts believed 80 mg was too high of a dosage.

Comparison of Age-Related Treatment Trial 

The Comparison of Age-Related Treatment Trial: Lucentis-Avastin (CATT) study was a two-year multicenter clinical trial that started in 2008 to compare the effectiveness of the two current treatments used for AMD. The results of the study concluded that both Lucentis and Avastin were equally effective in treating and improving vision, whether it was used monthly or on as needed basis.

Diabetic retinopathy

Early Treatment Diabetic Retinopathy Study (ETDRS)

A multicenter, randomized clinical trial that treating clinically significant macular edema (CSME) with focal argon laser photocoagulation reduced the risk of additional vision loss; aspirin showed no benefit in delaying or reducing the onset or severity of retinopathy. Likewise, aspirin did not increase the risk for development of retinopathy or the progression of retinopathy. The participants were followed up to at least five years after they were enrolled in the study.

Another significant contribution of the ETDRS was the introduction of the ETDRS charts, a set of three logMAR charts now widely used for the measurement of visual acuity in vision research and clinical practice.

Anti-VEGF therapy for diabetic retinopathy

A network of NEI supported researchers, who are a part of the Diabetic Retinopathy Clinical Research Network completed a two years study in 2015 that found the drug Lucentis can be an effective treatment for people with advanced stage diabetic retinopathy, called proliferative diabetic retinopathy. Proliferative diabetic retinopathy is the growth of abnormal blood vessels that leak blood. This can distort vision and damage the retina. Lucentis is one of several drugs called vascular endothelial growth factor (VEGF) inhibitors that can block the growth of abnormal blood vessels. This is also commonly used to treat age-related macular degeneration. This study suggests that using VEGF inhibitors may help prevent macular edema.

Glaucoma

The Advanced Glaucoma Intervention Study 

The Advanced Glaucoma Intervention Study (AGIS) is designed to provide a comprehensive assessment of the long-range outcomes of medical and surgical management in advanced glaucoma over a four-year period. The study uses visual function status to compare two intervention sequences in managing the disease.

After seven years of follow-up on patients enrolled in the AGIS, results revealed that blacks and whites differed in the way they benefited from the two treatment programs. Based on the study results, it is recommended that black patients with advanced glaucoma begin a treatment program that starts with laser surgery, which is consistent with current medical practice. In contrast, white patients with advanced glaucoma who have no life-threatening health problems should begin a treatment program that starts with trabeculectomy. This recommendation is inconsistent with current medical practice.

Because glaucoma is a lifelong disease, long-term information is important. The AGIS patients will continue to be followed for up to four more years.

The Idiopathic Intracranial Hypertension Trial

The Idiopathic Intracranial Hypertension (IIH) Treatment Trial enrolled participants in 2010-2012 and they were followed up for 6 months with the last follow-up in 2013. The study tested a glaucoma drug called acetazolamide (diamox) and weight loss plan to help improve vision for women who have idiopathic intracranial hypertension disorder. IIH is also called pseudotumor cerebri and usually affects overweight women. The most common symptoms associated with IIH are headaches and visual problems that include blind spots, poor side vision, double vision, and temporary episodes of blindness. The study results showed that a weight loss plan and acetazolamide can help preserve and restore vision for women with IIH.

Retinopathy of prematurity

Retinopathy of prematurity (ROP) is an eye disease that affects premature infants. It is one of the most common causes of vision loss in childhood and can lead to vision impairment and blindness as children grow older. The Early Treatment of Retinopathy of Prematurity Study (ETROP) helped doctors predict which infants with ROP would benefit from early treatment by identifying certain eye characteristics. The early intervention would try to prevent severe vision loss later in life. Infants with ROP were treated using cryotherapy. Cryotherapy freezes the outer parts of the retina to slow down or stop the growth of new abnormal blood vessels.

Amblyopia

Extended patching
Amblyopia, also known as lazy eye, is the most common cause of vision impairment among children. Amblyopia occurs when one eye is weakened because the eye and brain are not working together. The standard treatment for amblyopia is patching: covering the stronger eye with a patch for two hours a day to improve vision in the weaker eye. However, a recent report by the Pediatric Eye Disease Investigators Group (PEDIG) suggested that extending the daily duration of patching from two to six hours a day is effective at treating persistent amblyopia. The research was funded by NEI.

Uveitis

Uveitis and T cells

NEI researchers conducted a study that looked at the bacteria in the gut and how it protects the natural flora. Findings from studies suggest that this characteristic may be similar to how immune cells attack the eye in autoimmune eye diseases such as uveitis. Autoimmune uveitis is an inflammatory eye disease where the immune cells attack proteins in the eye. By studying how immune cells, also known as T cells, attack other parts of the body, researchers may gain further information on how the T cells are activated in the eye. It will also allow researchers to understand the disease better and develop treatments or therapies.

Ebola and uveitis

Following the 2014 Ebola virus outbreak in Liberia, NEI investigators joined other researchers and investigators to be a part of the PREVAIL III (Partnership for Research on Ebola Virus in Liberia) study. Ebola survivors reported a variety of complaints such as headaches, joint and muscle pain, eye fatigue and blurry vision. Some reports indicate that survivors have uveitis. Uveitis is a group of inflammatory autoimmune eye disease that produces swelling and destroys eye tissue. This can reduce vision or lead to vision loss. It is unknown to researchers what the physical long term effects of survivors, including eye health.

In March 2015, investigators from different eye institutes including NEI, oversaw the design of an eye clinic for PREVAIL III in Liberia. The NEI team will travel back to Liberia during the course of the study to assist other health care professionals and partners to help provide follow-up eye care in the clinic for study participants. PREVAL III is sponsored by the National Institute of Allergy and Infectious Diseases of NIH.

Retinitis pigmentosa

Gene therapy and retinitis pigmentosa
Retinitis pigmentosa (RP) is a group of rare, genetic disorders that involve a breakdown and loss of cells in the retina. Some of the most common symptoms of the disease are poor night vision and the loss of peripheral (side) vision. Currently there is no treatment to cure RP. A recent study by NEI-funded researchers showed that gene therapy can help preserve vision in late stage retinitis pigmentosa using canine models. Gene therapy halted the thinning of the retinal layer where photoreceptors are located and preserved the surviving photoreceptors. Research is still on going.

Bionic vision

NEI help fund the first retinal implant device called Argus II Retinal Prosthesis System, developed in 2011 by Second Sight Inc. to treat people who have retinitis pigmentosa. Argus II is a camera that is mounted on eyeglasses. The image is captured through the camera and processed by the video processing unit that transmits electrical pulse images to the retinal prosthesis through eyeglasses. This helps people with retinitis pigmentosa potentially move around and be independent. The NEI, Department of Energy, and the National Science Foundation (NSF) provided the support for the development of Argus II.

Leber congenital amaurosis

Leber congenital amaurosis (LCA) is an inherited disorder that causes vision loss. NEI-funded scientists discovered that treating patients with gene therapy for Leber congenital amaurosis (LCA) may improve eyesight and sensitivity of the retina. Some people with LCA have a mutated gene RPE65 that makes a protein found in the retinal pigment epithelium, which is a layer of cells that nourishes the light sensors or photoreceptors cells of the retina. LCA patients with this form of the disease were injected with an altered healthy RPE65 genes. Within days of the treatment, they reported increases in the ability to see dim light.

Notes and references

External links 
 Official website

Eye Institute
1968 establishments in Maryland
Research institutes established in 1968
Ophthalmology organizations
Medical research institutes in Maryland